Monnier is a French surname. Notable people with the surname include:

 Adrienne Monnier (1892–1955), French poet, bookseller and publisher
 André Monnier (born 1926), French ski jumper
 Blanche Monnier (1849–1913), French woman who was secretly kept locked up in a small room for 25 years
 Francis Monnier (fl. 1863), French literary figure
 Gabriel Monnier (born 1977), French figure skater
 Henry Monnier (1799–1877), French playwright, caricaturist and actor
 Jean-Charles Monnier (or Monier, 1758–1816), French Army general
 Louis Monnier (1900–1969), French track and field athlete
 Marc Monnier (1827–1885), French writer
 Mathilde Monnier (born 1959), French choreographer
 Paul Monnier (1907–1982), Swiss painter

See also 
 Le Monnier (disambiguation)
 Monier (disambiguation)

French-language surnames